Anatoli Abramovich Gantvarg (born 3 October 1948 in Minsk) is an international grandmaster in international draughts from Belarus. He won the Draughts World Championships in 1978, 1980, 1984 and 1985, as well as four Soviet Union championships (1969–1981). In 1984 and 1985 he was selected as Belarus Sportsperson of the Year.

Gantvarg has a university degree in mathematics, but throughout all of his life, he remained a professional draughts player. He has two daughters: one lives in the Netherlands and the other in Australia.

Publications
 Gantvarg, A. A. (1986) 50 поединков на 100 клетках, Polymya

References

Soviet draughts players
Belarusian draughts players
1948 births
Living people
Players of international draughts
Players of Russian draughts
Belarusian State University alumni